Nepenthes rubra may refer to:

Nepenthes rubra Hort.Van Houtte ex Rafarin (1869) — synonym of N. khasiana
Nepenthes rubra auct. non Hort.Van Houtte ex Rafarin: Nichols. (1886) — synonym of N. distillatoria

rubra